Demetrios I Kantakouzenos (1343 – 1384) was a governor of the Morea and the grandson of Emperor John VI Kantakouzenos. Demetrios was the son of Matthew Kantakouzenos, governor of Morea, and Irene Palaiologina. Demetrios was given the title of sebastokrator by Emperor John V Palaiologos in December 1357 and went to the Peloponnese with his father and grandfather in 1361.

One of at least two sons of Matthew Kantakouzenos, he disputed the succession to the Despotate of the Morea with Theodore I Palaiologos, the son of John V between 1380 and 1384. Our only information for this event is a cryptic reference in the Emperor Manuel II Palaiologos' funeral oration for his brother Theodore, who remarks on the insubordination of the "son" of Matthew Kantakouzenos, who had usurped the government on the death of Manuel Kantakouzenos in 1380. The traditional view is that this son was John, not Demetrios; however, D.A. Zakythenos, a historian of the Despotate of the Peloponnese, was inclined to believe that the son was Demetrios. According to the Byzantinist Donald Nicol, "This problem can hardly be satisfactory solved on the basis of the documentary evidence available".

He may have been the father of Theodore Kantakouzenos, the Byzantine ambassador to France and Venice.

References

Sources
 
 

14th-century Byzantine people
14th-century Despots of the Morea
Byzantine governors
Palaiologos dynasty
Demetrios
Demetrios 1
Sebastokrators
Year of birth uncertain
1384 deaths